This is a list of countries by oil imports based on The World Factbook ^ and other sources. Many countries also export oil, and some export more oil than they import.

See also
 List of countries by oil exports
 List of countries by net oil exports

References

Energy-related lists by country
Imports
Trade by commodity
List of countries by oil imports
Lists of countries
Import
International trade-related lists